Private James G. Clark (October 31, 1843 to December 16, 1911) was an American soldier who fought in the American Civil War. Clark received the country's highest award for bravery during combat, the Medal of Honor, for his action during the Second Battle of Petersburg in Virginia on 18 June 1864. He was honored with the award on 30 April 1892.

Biography
Clark was born in Germantown, Pennsylvania on 31 October 1843. He enlisted in 88th Pennsylvania Infantry. He died on 16 December 1911 and his remains are interred at the Fernwood Cemetery in Pennsylvania.

Medal of Honor citation

See also

List of American Civil War Medal of Honor recipients: A–F

References

1843 births
1911 deaths
People of Pennsylvania in the American Civil War
Union Army officers
United States Army Medal of Honor recipients
American Civil War recipients of the Medal of Honor
Military personnel from Philadelphia
Burials at Fernwood Cemetery (Lansdowne, Pennsylvania)